Archibald McKellar MacMechan  (June 21, 1862 – 7 August 1933) was a Canadian academic at Dalhousie University and writer. His works deal mainly with Nova Scotia and its history. The Halifax Disaster (Explosion) was an official history of the Halifax Explosion.

Born in Berlin, Ontario (now known as Kitchener), he is credited with reviving Herman Melville's reputation in North America. He had written to Melville in 1889, right at the end of his life.

He was awarded the Lorne Pierce Medal in 1932.

He was a long-term member of the Royal Nova Scotia Historical Society.

Works
 Concerning The Oldest English Literature, (1889)
 The Relation Of Hans Sachs To The Decameron, (1889)
 Vergil, (1897)
 William Greenwood, (1914)
 The Winning Of Popular Government, (1915)
 Three Sea Songs: Nova Scotia Chapbook, (1919)
 Old Province Tales..., (1924)
 Head-Waters Of Canadian Literature, (1924)
 There Go the Ships, (1928)
 The Centenary Of Haliburton's 'Nova Scotia''', (1930)
 Red Snow On Grand Pré, (1934)
 Late Harvest, (1934)
 The Halifax Disaster (Explosion), (1978)
 
Source:

References
Janet E. Baker (1977), Archibald MacMechan: Canadian man of letters''

Notes

External links

 
 
 
 
Nova Scotia History Books. at www.blupete.com
Dan Conlin Canadian Privateering Homepage, "Archibald MacMechan's 'Ballad of the Rover' "
The Archives of Archibald MacMechan: A Guide
Archibald MacMechan’s report, The Halifax Disaster

1862 births
1933 deaths
Academic staff of the Dalhousie University
Fellows of the Royal Society of Canada
Johns Hopkins University alumni
University of Toronto alumni
Persons of National Historic Significance (Canada)